Nauta salamander (Bolitoglossa altamazonica), also known as the Nauta mushroomtongue salamander, is a species of salamander in the family Plethodontidae. It is found on the eastern and lower slopes of the Andes from Venezuela and Colombia through Ecuador and Peru to Bolivia and east into adjacent Brazil. Its common name refers to its type locality, Nauta, in the Loreto Province, Peruvian Amazon. It might a composite of several species.

Description
Adult individuals measure  in snout–vent length; the tail is almost as long. Colouration is variable: most individuals are darker dorsally and laterally than ventrally, but some have light dorsal streaking and mottling; others are uniformly dorsally dark-coloured.

Habitat and conservation
Natural habitat of Bolitoglossa altamazonica is lowland rainforest where it occurs on low vegetation. It is a locally common species throughout its range. It is locally threatened by habitat loss caused by agriculture and planting of trees.

References

Bolitoglossa
Amphibians of Bolivia
Amphibians of Brazil
Amphibians of Colombia
Amphibians of Ecuador
Amphibians of Peru
Amphibians of Venezuela
Amphibians described in 1874
Taxonomy articles created by Polbot